Reclining Nude is a painting by Italian artist Amedeo Modigliani. Done in oil on canvas in 1917, the painting was one of Modigliani's celebrated series of nudes. The work is in the collection of the Metropolitan Museum of Art.

References

1917 paintings
Paintings by Amedeo Modigliani
Paintings in the collection of the Metropolitan Museum of Art
Nude art